The Luengué Hunting Reserve (also known as Luengue Hunting Area) is located in Luengué, Mavinga, Cuando Cubango, Angola.

References

Protected areas of Angola
Protected areas established in 1959